Iris pallida subsp. illyrica, synonym Iris pseudopallida, (the southern Adriatic iris) is a subspecies of Iris pallida. It is a rhizomatous perennial from Croatia. It has flat, curved of sickle-shaped leaves, tall slender stems, 3–8 fragrant flowers, in shades of violet, or pale violet flowers, mauve, lavender, purple, yellow or white, between May and June. The iris was originally thought to be a separate species, but later classified as subspecies of Iris pallida, although in Croatia, it is still known as Iris pseudopallida. It is cultivated as an ornamental plant in temperate regions, especially in the Balkan regions.

Description
It has a bluish coloured rhizome, and has flat, curved, or sickle-shaped leaves. They can survive the winter. It has branches (or pedicels) near top of the plant. The stem has (scarious) membranous, (or translucent) spathes (leaves of the flower bud). Similar to Iris illyrica, the spathes can have a dirty, rusty markings. The stems (and the branches) hold between 3 and 8 flowers, between May and June.
The fragrant flowers, come in shades of violet, or pale violet flowers, mauve, lavender, purple, yellow or white. Like other irises, it has 2 pairs of petals, 3 large sepals (outer petals), known as the 'falls' and 3 inner, smaller petals (or tepals), known as the 'standards'. The falls are bent backwards, they have a light brown edge and reddish purple veins. They also have a thick strip of yellow hairs (the 'beard') in the centre. The flowers has dry, spheroidal pollen, that are 51–100 µm large. After the iris has flowered, it produces a seed capsule, that has 5 mm long seeds.

Biochemistry
In 2001, a karyologic study was carried out on various irises in the Alpine-Dinaric region (relating to the Dinaric Alps mountain chain), which included in addition Iris cengialti, Iris illyrica and Iris pallida.
It found that the mitotic number of chromosomes of most species was 2n=24. As most irises are diploid, having two sets of chromosomes, this can be used to identify hybrids and classification of groupings.

In 2003, a study was carried out on flavonoids within the leaves of Iris illyrica and Iris pallida subsp. illyrica. It found significant quantitative differences in the leaf flavonoid patterns.

Taxonomy

It is commonly known as the southern Adriatic iris, It is also known in Croatia as jadranska perunika meaning Adriatic iris.

It was first collected by Ivo Trinajstić on 1 May 1973, and then it was first published and described in 1976. Trinajstić treated the plant as a separate species to Iris pallida due to the difference in spathes. Iris pallida typically has silvery white spathes while Iris illyrica and Iris pallida subsp. illyrica have spathes that have a dirty pale rusty tint. In 1991, Nikolic and Mitic also found that the size and shape of epidermal cells and stoma, was another difference, but these could be down to habitat effects.

It was also thought to be related to Iris reichenbachii, but a study on Iris orjenii found various differences. Often plants are called one name and are later changed due to a new study.

Later, the species was classified as a subspecies of Iris pallida, Iris pallida subsp. pseudopallida.<ref>{{cite web |title=Posts Tagged 'Iris pallida 'Argentea Variegata |url=https://namethatplant.wordpress.com/tag/iris-pallida-argentea-variegata/ |publisher=namethatplant.com |access-date=25 November 2015}}</ref> Although, in Croatia, it is still known as Iris pseudopallida.

Distribution and habitat

It is native to Southern Europe.

Range
It is found along the Adriatic Coast, of the Balkan Peninsula. In Montenegro, Herzegovina, in Croatia, (including south Dalmatia,) and also in Albania.

It is normally found in Croatia along with Iris reichenbachii'', another endemic iris.

Habitat
It grows on rocks (made of limestone or karst), dry meadows or pastures.

They can be found at an altitude above , above sea level.

Conservation
It has large colonies of plants, but they may be under risk from collection.

Cultivation

The plants are grown in gardens in Croatia and surrounding countries, and are also available for cultivation elsewhere, used in garden borders.

It can be found in the Biokovo Botanical Garden Kotišina.

Propagation
Irises can generally be propagated by division, or by seed growing.

Toxicity
Like many other irises, most parts of the plant are poisonous (rhizome and leaves), if mistakenly ingested can cause stomach pains and vomiting. Also handling the plant may cause a skin irritation or an allergic reaction.

References

External links
 Image of the photo in Popovo in Bosnia

pseudopallida
Plants described in 1976
Garden plants
Flora of Europe
Flora of Croatia
Flora of Albania
Flora of Montenegro